Bronagh Gallagher (born 26 April 1972) is an Irish singer and actress from Northern Ireland. Gallagher had her first acting role in the 1989 television movie Dear Sarah. In 2020, she was listed at number 33 on The Irish Times list of Ireland's greatest film actors.

Early life
During her teenage years, she got involved in drama and music activities through school and joined a local amateur dramatics group called the Oakgrove Theatre Company. At one time she was a backing singer in a local band called The Listener (1989–90). The band practised in a garage that belonged to Kevin McLaughlin, the drummer. Laurence Harkin, aka L, was lead singer and guitar.

Career
A former hairdresser, Gallagher's big break came when she starred as Bernie in The Commitments (1991). She followed up with small parts in Pulp Fiction (1994) and Star Wars: Episode I – The Phantom Menace (1999). Other film appearances include You, Me & Marley (1992), Mary Reilly (1996), Divorcing Jack (1998), Thunderpants (2002), Skagerrak (2003), Tristan & Isolde (2006), Last Chance Harvey (2008), Sherlock Holmes (2009) and Grabbers (2012).

Gallagher has appeared onstage in Théâtre de Complicité touring production of The Street of Crocodiles and The National Theatre's production War Horse as Rose Narracott.

Gallagher's first album Precious Soul was released in 2004 on the Salty Dog Records label and was produced by John Reynolds. The album features collaborations with Brian Eno on the songs "He Don't Love You" and "Hooks". Gallagher wrote most of the music on the album, played the drums and sang lead vocals.

Gallagher released a second album Bronagh Gallagher in 2012 and a third album Gather Your Greatness in 2016.

In 2009, Gallagher starred alongside a well-known cast on the MySpace/Vertigo Films production Faintheart and starred in the BBC Three comedy TV series Pramface in 2012.

On television, she played the mother of young Nick in the BBC drama Nick Nickleby. She played Trisha Meehan in The Field of Blood and Ada Mason in Agatha Christie's Poirot Series 10 episode "The Mystery of the Blue Train".

An image of Gallagher, in character as Bernie McGloughlin in the film The Commitments, was featured on an Irish postage stamp as part of the Ireland 1996: Irish Cinema Centenary series issued by An Post. The image includes her The Commitments co-stars Angeline Ball as Imelda Quirke, Maria Doyle Kennedy as Natalie Murphy and Robert Arkins as Jimmy Rabbitte.

Filmography

Film

Television

Stage roles

Awards and nominations

References

External links
 Bronagh Gallagher in Concert at The Ardhowen Theatre, donniephair.com; accessed 5 August 2017.

1972 births
Living people
Film actresses from Northern Ireland
Musicians from Derry (city)
Drummers from Northern Ireland
Stage actresses from Northern Ireland
21st-century women singers from Northern Ireland
21st-century drummers